Sterling Optical is a franchised retail optical chain headquartered in New York, New York. Its parent company is Emerging Vision, whose CEO is Glenn Spina.

History

Sterling Optical opened in 1914 with a single store in the financial district of New York City. In 1954, a second location opened in Washington, D.C.

In 1966, Sterling Optical acquired IPCO, a retail optical chain in the northeastern United States. The chain grew to 20 stores by 1970 and to 65 by 1975. Over the next 5 years, the chain grew to almost 130 stores.

In 1992, the company emerged from bankruptcy after being purchased by Cohen Fashion Optical, and was reorganized and incorporated in New York and renamed Sterling Vision Inc., with stores doing business as Sterling Optical. Emerging Vision was created as the parent company at the same time. The company has since grown by both acquisitions and franchising. In 1993 it acquired the Site for Sore Eyes chain in California, and with it VCC (Vision Centers of California), a specialized healthcare maintenance organization licensed by the California Department of Corporations that operates under the tradename "Sterling VisionCare", usually adjacent to a Sterling Optical location. In 1996 the company acquired Vision Centers of America. In the 1990s it moved into online retailing.

, the company has more than 125 Sterling locations in the United States and the U.S. Virgin Islands, plus 40 Site for Sore Eyes locations in California.

In 1996, the company opened two lasik centers named Insight Laser Centers, one in New York and the other in San Francisco. These locations have since ceased operations.

Sterling Optical began using cartoon character Mr. Magoo in advertising in 2005.

References

External links
 Sterling Optical
 Site for Sore Eyes

Companies based in New York City
American companies established in 1914  
Retail companies established in 1914
Companies that filed for Chapter 11 bankruptcy in 1992
Eyewear companies of the United States
1914 establishments in New York City